Patoka Lake is the second-largest reservoir in the U.S. state of Indiana (after Lake Monroe) and is spread across Dubois, Crawford, and Orange counties in southern Indiana.

Lake
Created as a joint effort between the US Army Corps of Engineers and the Indiana Department of Natural Resources, the lake is one of eight such reservoirs built in the state to provide a secure water supply and as a method of flood control.  The lake covers 8,800 surface acres (36 km²) of water in the summer.

The lake is fed by several smaller tributaries including Allen Creek, Painter Creek, and Ritter Creek. After the lake was created several parks and nature preserves were established around it totaling . The lake and dam is still managed by a cooperative management team of the Army Corps of Engineers and the Indiana Department of Natural Resources.

Patoka Lake is a great place for photography, as it is inhabited by migrating birds, a large variety of fish and beautiful lake shores. The lake has been heavily stocked with bass, bluegill, catfish, redear, crappie, and walleye.  Once a year the Lake Association hosts GarDaze, an event bringing in avid fisherman from around the world, including fishing celebrities like Babe Winkleman and Bill Dance. Other facilities include an archery range, boat ramps, a cross-country skiing course, fishing areas (including ice fishing), a disc golf course, trails for hiking and bicycling, hunting areas, interpretive and recreational programs, star parties, picnic shelters, swimming areas, and waterskiing zones. The lake also hosts a large campground with over 500 camping sites.

Patoka Lake has been very beneficial to the surrounding community and the state of Indiana. The lake has generated over $19.4 million in revenue and visitor expenditures in 2005 and has so far prevented over $88 million in flood damage. In 2006 the lake saw 648,738 visitors who provide jobs for 197 local residents.

References

External links

Local tourism information
Patoka Lake at U.S. Army Corps of Engineers, Louisville District

Protected areas of Crawford County, Indiana
Protected areas of Dubois County, Indiana
Reservoirs in Indiana
Protected areas of Orange County, Indiana
Southwestern Indiana
Dams in Indiana
United States Army Corps of Engineers dams
Nature centers in Indiana
Bodies of water of Orange County, Indiana
Bodies of water of Crawford County, Indiana
Bodies of water of Dubois County, Indiana